Kishida (written: 岸田 lit. "bank/shore, rice field") is a Japanese surname. Notable people with the surname include:

 Fumio Kishida (born 1957), Prime Minister of Japan since 2021
 Hiroki Kishida (born 1981), Japanese football player
, Japanese actor and entertainer
 Kunio Kishida (1890-1954), Japanese dramatist and writer
 Kyōko Kishida (1930–2006), Japanese actress, voice actress, writer of children's books and daughter of Kunio Kishida
 Kyukichi Kishida (1888–1968), Japanese entomologist
 Mamoru Kishida (born 1981), Japanese baseball player
, Japanese swimmer
 Mitsugi Kishida (1916–1988), Japanese photographer
 Ryūsei Kishida (born 1891), Japanese painter
 Shin Kishida (1939–1982), Japanese actor
 Toshiko Kishida (1863-1901), Japanese feminist
 Yasunori Kishida, Japanese lepidopterologist

Fictional characters
, a character in The Return of Ultraman
, a character in Captain Tsubasa

Japanese-language surnames